The Measure of a Man is a 1924 American silent drama film directed by Arthur Rosson and starring William Desmond, Marin Sais and Francis Ford.

Cast
 William Desmond as John Fairmeadow
 Albert J. Smith as Jack Flack
 Francis Ford as 'Pale' Peter
 Marin Sais as Clare, his wife
 William Dyer as Billy the Beast 
 Robert Gordon as Donald 
 Harry Tenbrook as Charley
 Zala Davis as Jenny Hitch
 William H. Turner as Tom Hitch 
 Mary McAllister as Pattie Batch

References

Bibliography
 Robert B. Connelly. The Silents: Silent Feature Films, 1910-36, Volume 40, Issue 2. December Press, 1998.

External links
 

1924 films
1924 drama films
1920s English-language films
American silent feature films
Silent American drama films
American black-and-white films
Universal Pictures films
Films directed by Arthur Rosson
1920s American films